The Pentecostal World Fellowship is a fellowship of Evangelical Pentecostal churches and denominations from across the world. The headquarters is in Tulsa, Oklahoma. Its leader is William Wilson (Tulsa, OK).

History
The Pentecostal World Fellowship was founded in 1947 at Zürich, Switzerland, during a conference of Pentecostal leaders. This meeting was organized by Swiss pastor Leonard Steiner, who was assisted by David du Plessis. Since then, the Conference has been conducted in various major cities around the world, every three years.
In 2001, the conference in Los Angeles, California, was convened in celebration of the Azusa Street Revival.

In 2019, William Wilson became Chairman of the organization.

Conferences

The Pentecostal World Fellowship has a conference every three years.

Member organizations
In 2022, the Pentecostal World Fellowship has 76 member representatives in 47 countries. 

 Argentina : Federacion Confraternidad Evangelica Pentecostal
 Australia : Australian Christian Churches 
 Australia : CRC Churches International 
 Bangladesh : Bangladesh Assemblies of God
 Bangladesh : The Pentecostal Assemblies of Bangladesh
 Brazil : Assembleias de Deus no Brasil 
 Brazil : Wesleyan Methodist Church 
 Canada : Apostolic Church of Pentecost of Canada 
 Canada : Foursquare Gospel Church of Canada 
 Canada : Open Bible Faith Fellowship of Canada
 Canada : Pentecostal Assemblies of Canada 
 Canada : Pentecostal Assemblies of Newfoundland and Labrador 
 Canada : Pentecostal Holiness Church of Canada
 Canada : Independent Assemblies of God, International 
 Ethiopia : Full Gospel Believers Church 
 Europe : Pentecostal European Fellowship
 Finland : The Pentecostal Church of Finland
 Ghana : Lighthouse Chapel International 
 Ghana : The Church of Pentecost 
 Great Britain : Assemblies of God in Great Britain 
 Haiti : International Mission of Holy Church of Christ
 Hong Kong : Asia Assembly Mission Council
 Hong Kong : Pentecostal Holiness Church 
 Hungary : Evangelical Pentecostal Fellowship
 India : Assemblies of God in India
 India : Fellowship of the Pentecostal Churches
 India : Manna Full Gospel Churches 
 Indonesia : Bethany Church of Indonesia
 Japan : Japan Assemblies of God 
 Liberia : Liberia Assemblies of God
 Lithuania : Union of Pentecostal Churches of Lithuania
 Malaysia : Assemblies of God of Malaysia
 Malaysia : Calvary Church
 Namibia : Apostolic Faith Mission of Namibia
 Netherlands : United Pentecostal and Evangelical Churches 
 Nigeria : Assemblies of God Nigeria
 Nigeria : The Sword of the Spirit Ministries
 Norway : Pentecostal Movement of Norway
 Pakistan : Pakistan Assemblies of God
 Pakistan : BMS Bethal Church
 Philippines : Cathedral of Praise 
 Philippines : Church of the Foursquare Gospel in the Philippines 
 Philippines : Jireh Evangel Church Planting Philippines Inc.
 Romania : Assemblies of God Romania
 Samoa : Samoa Pentecostal Fellowship
 Singapore : Assemblies of God of Singapore
 South Africa : Apostolic Faith Mission of South Africa 
 South Africa : Assemblies of God South Africa
 South Africa : Grace Bible Church
 South Korea : Korea Assemblies of God
 Sweden : The Swedish Pentecostal Movement
 Togo : Eglise des Assemblees de Dieu du Togo
 Uganda: Miracle Fire International Ministries
 United States : Assemblies of God USA 
 United States : Church of God (Cleveland, Tennessee)
 United States : Golgotha Church on the Rock, Inc.
 United States : International Center for Spiritual Renewal
 United States : International Church of the Foursquare Gospel 
 United States : International Pentecostal Holiness Church 
 United States : St. Stephen's Cathedral Church of God in Christ

See also 
 World Evangelical Alliance
 Bible
 Born again
 Worship service (evangelicalism)
 God in Christianity
 Believers' Church

References

External links

 

1947 establishments in Switzerland
Pentecostal denominations
Christian organizations established in 1947